The Roman Catholic Diocese of Bethlehem is a diocese located in the city of Bethlehem in the Ecclesiastical province of Bloemfontein in South Africa.

History
 February 12, 1948: Established as Apostolic Vicariate of Bethlehem from the Apostolic Vicariate of Kroonstad
 January 11, 1951: Promoted as Diocese of Bethlehem

Special churches
The Cathedral is the Cathedral of the Immaculate Heart of Mary in Bethlehem.

Bishops

 Vicars Apostolic of Bethlehem (Latin Church) 
 Léon Klerlein (1948.02.12 – 1950.05.22)
 Peter Kelleter (1950.03.12 – 1951.01.11 see below)
 Bishops of Bethlehem (Latin Church)
 Peter Kelleter (see above 1951.01.11 – 1975.07.05)
 Hubert Bucher (1976.12.09 - 2008.12.31)
 Jan de Groef (since 2008.12.31)

Other priest of this diocese who became bishop
Xolelo Thaddaeus Kumalo, appointed Bishop of Eshowe in   2008

See also
Roman Catholicism in South Africa

References

External links
 GCatholic.org 
 Catholic Hierarchy 

Roman Catholic dioceses in South Africa
Christian organizations established in 1948
Roman Catholic dioceses and prelatures established in the 20th century
1948 establishments in South Africa
Roman Catholic Ecclesiastical Province of Bloemfontein